Isoglossa ciliata is a species of plant in the family Acanthaceae native to southern Africa.

Description 
Isoglossa ciliata is a sprawling herbaceous perennial that grows on forest floor and margins, sometimes to 1 meter tall. It occurs from Knysna to KwaZulu-Natal. The leaves are simple, opposite, and ovate. The flower is white, occasionally pink, two-lipped, lower lip divided into 3 with mauve markings in the centre.

References 

ciliata
Perennial plants
Flora of South Africa